Amt Meyenburg is an Amt ("collective municipality") in the district of Prignitz, in Brandenburg, Germany. Its seat is in Meyenburg.

The Amt Meyenburg consists of the following municipalities:
Gerdshagen
Halenbeck-Rohlsdorf
Kümmernitztal
Marienfließ
Meyenburg

Demography

References

Meyenburg
Prignitz